Marshall Road station is a SEPTA Route 102 trolley stop in Drexel Hill, Pennsylvania. It is between Cheswold and Blanchard Roads on Marshall Road.

Trolleys arriving at this station travel between 69th Street Terminal in Upper Darby, Pennsylvania and Sharon Hill, Pennsylvania. The station has a shed with a roof where people can go inside when it is raining on one platform and a bench on the other. Both platforms are on the north side of the Marshall Road grade crossing only. Because the stop is in a residential area, no parking is available.

Station layout

External links

 Station from Marshall Road from Google Maps Street View

SEPTA Media–Sharon Hill Line stations